John Fredy Parra Celada (born November 9, 1974 in Carepa, Antioquia) is a Colombian former professional road cyclist.

Major results

2002
 1st Stage 4 Clásico RCN
 2nd Road race, National Road Championships
2003
 1st Overall Clàsica Gobernacion de Casanare
1st Stages 1 & 5
 Vuelta a la Independencia Nacional
1st Stages 2, 3 & 6
 1st Stage 1 Vuelta a Colombia
 1st Stage 3 Clásico RCN
 1st Prologue Vuelta a Guatemala
2004
 1st Madison, Pan American Track Championships (with José Serpa)
 2nd Overall Vuelta a Uraba
 3rd Overall Clasico de Ejecutivos
2005
 Pan American Championships
1st Road race
3rd Points race
 1st Stage 8 Vuelta a la Independencia Nacional
2006
 1st Stage 2 Tour de Beauce
 1st Stage 2 Clasico Ciclistico Banfoandes
 3rd Overall Vuelta Sonora
2007
 1st Stage 8 Vuelta a Colombia
 2nd Road race, National Road Championships
 2nd Overall Vuelta a San Luis Potosi
1st Stage 5
 3rd Univest Grand Prix

External links

 

1974 births
Living people
Colombian male cyclists
Vuelta a Colombia stage winners
Sportspeople from Antioquia Department
Competitors at the 2006 Central American and Caribbean Games